Judith Querida Longyear (20 September 1938–13 December 1995) was an American mathematician and professor whose research interests included graph theory and combinatorics. Longyear was the second woman to ever earn a mathematics Ph.D. from Pennsylvania State University, where she studied under the supervision of Sarvadaman Chowla and wrote a thesis entitled Tactical Configurations. Longyear taught mathematics at several universities including California Institute of Technology, Dartmouth College and Wayne State University. She worked on nested block designs and Hadamard matrices.

References

Graph theorists
20th-century American mathematicians
American women mathematicians
1938 births
1995 deaths
20th-century women mathematicians
20th-century American women